Master of None is an American comedy-drama streaming television series, which was released for streaming on November 6, 2015, on Netflix. The series was created by Aziz Ansari and Alan Yang, with the first two seasons starring Ansari in the lead role of Dev Shah, a 30-year-old actor, and the third season starring Lena Waithe in the lead role of Denise, a 37-year-old lesbian novelist, mostly following their romantic, professional, and personal experiences. The first season is set in New York City, and consists of ten episodes. The second season, which takes place in Italy and New York, consists of ten episodes and was released on May 12, 2017. The third season, Moments in Love, premiered on Netflix on May 23, 2021.

Master of None has won three Emmy Awards and a Golden Globe. The series has received critical acclaim, appeared on multiple year-end top ten lists, and received multiple awards and nominations.

Production and development

Conception
The show's title alludes to the phrase "Jack of all trades, master of none" and was originally suggested by Ansari. The series later incorporated a song of the same name by Beach House. Ansari said it took months to come up with the show's title and he and Yang did not agree on it until all of the episodes were completed.

Third season
Shortly before the premiere of the second season in April 2017, Ansari told Vulture, "I don't know if we're going to do a season three. I wouldn't be surprised if I needed a looonng break before I could come back to it. I've got to become a different guy before I write a third season, is my personal thought, I've got to get married or have a kid or something. I don't have anything else to say about being a young guy being single in New York eating food around town all the time." In July 2018, Netflix head of original content Cindy Holland expressed interest in creating a third season "when Aziz is ready."

Production began on the third season in London in early 2020, but was put on hold because of the COVID-19 pandemic. By January 2021, production resumed, with Naomi Ackie joining the cast. The five-episode season, titled Master of None Presents: Moments in Love premiered on May 23, 2021. The season focuses on Lena Waithe's character Denise, with all episodes directed by Ansari and written by Ansari and Waithe.

Cast
 Aziz Ansari as Dev Shah (seasons 1–2; recurring season 3), a commercial actor whose best-known work was a Go-Gurt commercial.
 Eric Wareheim as Arnold Baumheiser (seasons 1–2), Dev's friend who Ansari describes as the "token white friend". Wareheim notes his character's friendship is based on his real-life friendship with Ansari as they both enjoy eating. The role was originally set to be played by Harris Wittels before his death in February 2015.
 Noël Wells as Rachel Silva (season 1; guest season 2), Dev's primary romantic interest in the first season. Rachel works as a music publicist.
 Lena Waithe as Denise, Dev's friend, who is a lesbian. In an Entertainment Weekly interview, Waithe said that her character was not originally intended to be African-American or gay but that Ansari wanted Denise's personality to reflect Waithe's own, so they rewrote her part.
 Kelvin Yu as Brian Chang (seasons 1–2), Dev's friend who is the son of Taiwanese immigrants. An interview with Yu in Vulture.com noted that Brian represented the "onscreen version of co-creator Alan Yang, Dev's chill, super-good-looking friend" and that he was a "hottie".
 Alessandra Mastronardi as Francesca (season 2), an Italian woman Dev befriends and later falls in love with in the second season. She later visits him in New York.
 Naomi Ackie as Alicia (season 3), Denise's wife in the third season.

Also making recurring appearances in the series are Todd Barry, who plays a movie director named Todd; Colin Salmon, who plays a fictionalized version of himself; H. Jon Benjamin as Benjamin, an acting colleague on the film The Sickening; Leonard Ouzts as Lawrence, the producer of Clash of the Cupcakes in the second season; and Ansari's real-life parents Shoukath and Fatima, who play Dev's parents. There have been guest appearances by Danielle Brooks, Claire Danes, David Krumholtz, Noah Emmerich, Bobby Cannavale, John Legend, Kym Whitley, Raven-Symoné, Riccardo Scamarcio, Clare-Hope Ashitey, and Angela Bassett.

Episodes

Series overview

Season 1 (2015)

Season 2 (2017)

Season 3: Master of None Presents: Moments in Love (2021)

Soundtrack
Pitchfork noted season two for its feature of "some great music". David Bowie, Kraftwerk, D'Angelo, Tupac Shakur, Digable Planets, and Vengaboys are some of the artists featured throughout the season's episodes. The show also features a performance from John Legend covering a Michael Jackson song, "I Can't Help It", and Italian music to match the show's early setting in Italy, including Ryan Paris and "Scatman (Ski-Ba-Bop-Ba-Dop-Bop)" as a minor plotline.

Influences
In Season 2 of Master of None critics noted some distinct influences on the show. In the opening of the episode "The Thief", a stack of DVDs from The Criterion Collection on Dev's (Aziz Ansari) bed can be seen:
Federico Fellini's La Dolce Vita (1960), 8½ (1963), and Amarcord (1973)
Vittorio De Sica's Bicycle Thieves (1948)
Michelangelo Antonioni's L'Avventura (1960) and La Notte (1961)

In Vulture, it is noted that Master of None references classic Italian films and films of the French New Wave throughout the second season. They also cited the films of Woody Allen as a strong influence. They noted, "It's almost impossible for any filmmaker to tell a New York-set story about romance, career, and culture without aping Woody Allen". In particular they describe Dev and Francesca's "walk and talk romance", and "trips to museums as a recall to Allen's Isaac and Diane Keaton's Mary in Manhattan (1979)". They also compare Dev's trying to connect in the dating scene as reminiscent of Alvy Singer's failed attempts to replace his ex-girlfriend in Annie Hall (1977). They also cited the mere casting of Alessandra Mastronardi who plays Francesca but who was also in Allen's 2012 film To Rome with Love.

Slate also noted other references on the show, where the plot and directorial choices of the episode "The Thief" in particular seems to be heavily influenced by Bicycle Thieves. Other references mentioned included ones from the episode "Amarsi Un Po" which include the dancing scene between Dev and Francesca is a reference to the dancing scene in 8. The kissing through glass in "Buona Notte" is a direct reference to a scene in L'Eclisse. Dev and Francesca also specifically watch L'Avventura in his apartment.

Critics have also noted Spike Lee's influence on the show especially in the "Thanksgiving" episode. Wong Kar-wai's 2000 film In the Mood for Love has been selected by critics as one ripe for comparison with Master of None. In particular the episode "Buona Notte" "where would-be lovers express their feelings for each other through gestures and furtive touches instead of full-on physical contact."

Reception

Critical response

Season 1
On Rotten Tomatoes, the first season holds an approval rating of 100% based on 67 reviews, with an average rating of 9.03/10. The site's critical consensus reads, "Exceptionally executed with charm, humor, and heart, Master of None is a refreshingly offbeat take on a familiar premise." On Metacritic, the season has a score of 91 out of 100, based on 31 critics, indicating "universal acclaim".

James Poinewozik of The New York Times called it "the year's best comedy straight out of the gate" and a "mature rom-com." IGN's Matt Fowler gave the entire first season an 8.8 out of 10, saying "by the second episode it takes flight and offers up a very funny, unique take on food, dating, relationships, etc (the usual suspects). Ansari is a smart and engaging presence and his perspective on things lends itself very well to this type of single-camera comedy. And his supporting cast, particularly Wells, is on point. A few episodes may have fizzled out right at the finish...but there's no denying Master of Nones success overall." James Dempsey of Newstalk described the show as "like a transatlantic cousin of Ricky Gervais' Extras, another story of an actor navigating show business and his personal life. But whereas that show relied heavily on stunt cameos of Hollywood actors playing pantomime versions of themselves—along with painfully blunt awkwardness that attempts to wring every possible laugh out of increasingly cringe comedy—Master of None is content and confident to let the viewer warm to it entirely on its terms. And it's all the better for it."

Season 2
On Rotten Tomatoes, the second season also holds an approval rating of 100% based on 61 reviews, with an average rating of 8.83/10. The site's critical consensus reads, "Master of Nones second season picks up where its predecessor left off, delivering an ambitious batch of episodes that builds on the show's premise while adding surprising twists." On Metacritic, the season has a score of 91 out of 100, based on 24 critics, indicating "universal acclaim".

Season 3
On Rotten Tomatoes, the third season holds an approval rating of 82% based on 39 reviews, with an average rating of 7.73/10. The site's critical consensus reads, "Anchored by powerful performances from Lena Waithe and Naomi Ackie, Moments in Love is undeniably slow TV, but patient viewers will be rewarded with a surprising and mature season that wears its cinematic inspirations on its sleeve." On Metacritic, the season has a score of 76 out of 100, based on 17 critics, indicating "generally favorable reviews".

Top ten lists
Master of None was included on many lists of best TV shows of 2015. Jaime Lutz from Time Out New York called it the best TV show of 2015. In addition, it was awarded the runner-up position by Matthew Gilbert from The Boston Globe, Mark Peikert from TheWrap, and Paste. Master of None was also ranked as one of the top 10 shows of the year by many publications, including Complex, Entertainment Weekly, Film School Rejects, The Guardian, IGN, Los Angeles Times, The New York Times, People, TIME, TV Guide, Vanity Fair, Variety, Vogue, and The Washington Post. In 2018, TV Guide listed the "Thanksgiving" episode as number 10 in their "TV Guide's 65 Best Episodes of the 21st Century" issue.

Accolades

Notes

References

External links
 
 

2015 American television series debuts
2021 American television series endings
2010s American comedy-drama television series
2020s American comedy-drama television series
Lesbian-related television shows
Indian-American television
English-language Netflix original programming
Primetime Emmy Award-winning television series
Television series by 3 Arts Entertainment
Television series by Fremulon
Television series by Universal Television
Television shows filmed in New York City
Television shows set in Italy
Television shows set in New York City
Television shows shot in London
Television productions suspended due to the COVID-19 pandemic